Pyrroloquinoline quinone (PQQ), also called methoxatin, is a redox cofactor and antioxidant. Produced by bacteria, it is found in soil and foods such as kiwifruit, as well as human breast milk. Enzymes using PQQ as a redox cofactor are called quinoproteins and play a variety of redox roles. Quinoprotein glucose dehydrogenase is used as a glucose sensor in bacteria. PQQ stimulates growth in bacteria. Eukaryote targets, including mammalian lactate dehydrogenase, are of more interest to health. It is suggested that PQQ taken as a dietary supplement could promote mitochondrial biogenesis via this pathway as well as PGC-1α.

History 
It was discovered by J.G. Hauge as the third redox cofactor after nicotinamide and flavin in bacteria (although he hypothesised that it was naphthoquinone). Anthony and Zatman also found the unknown redox cofactor in alcohol dehydrogenase. In 1979, Salisbury and colleagues as well as Duine and colleagues extracted this prosthetic group from methanol dehydrogenase of methylotrophs and identified its molecular structure. Adachi and colleagues discovered that PQQ was also found in Acetobacter.

Biosynthesis 

A novel aspect of PQQ is its biosynthesis in bacteria from a ribosomally translated precursor peptide, PqqA (UniProt ). A glutamic acid and a tyrosine in PqqA are cross-linked by the radical SAM enzyme PqqE with the help of PqqD in the first step of PqqA modification. A protease then liberates the Glu-Tyr molecule from the peptide backbone. PqqB oxidizes the 2 and 3 positions on the tyrosine ring, forming a quinone which quickly becomes AHQQ, finishing the pyridine ring. PqqC then forms the final pyrrole ring.

Efforts to understand PQQ biosynthesis have contributed to broad interest in radical SAM enzymes and their ability to modify proteins, and an analogous radical SAM enzyme-dependent pathway has since been found that produces the putative electron carrier mycofactocin, using a valine and a tyrosine from the precursor peptide, MftA.

Role in proteins 
Quinoproteins generally embed the cofactor in a unique, six-bladed beta-barrel structure. Some examples also have a heme c prosthetic group and are termed quinohemoproteins. Although quinoproteins are mostly found in bacteria, a Coprinopsis cinerea (fungus) pyranose dehydrogenase has been shown to use PQQ in its crystal structure.

PQQ also appears to be essential in some other eukaryotic proteins, albeit not as the direct electron carrier. The aforementioned mammalian lactate dehydrogenase requires PQQ to run but uses NADH as the direct redox cofactor. It seems to speed up the reaction by catalyzing the oxidation of NADH via redox cycling.

Controversy regarding role as vitamin 
The scientific journal Nature published the 2003 paper by Kasahara and Kato that essentially stated that PQQ was a new vitamin and in 2005, an article by Anthony and Fenton that stated that the 2003 Kasahara and Kato paper drew incorrect and unsubstantiated conclusions. An article by Bruce Ames in The Proceedings of the National Academy of Sciences in 2018 identified pyrroloquinoline quinone as a "longevity vitamin" not essential for immediate survival, but necessary for long-term health.

See also 
 L-aminoadipate-semialdehyde dehydrogenase,

References 

Pyrroloquinoline quinone enzymes
Cofactors
Tricarboxylic acids
Nitrogen heterocycles
Heterocyclic compounds with 3 rings